Gangland is a 1998 Philippine action gangster film directed by Peque Gallaga and Lore Reyes. The film stars Ryan Eigenmann, Jason Salcedo, Junell Hernando and Justin Simoy.

Cast
Main cast
 Ryan Eigenmann as Kano
 Jason Salcedo as Orson
 Junell Hernando as Tinto
 Justin Simoy as Dodge
 Lara Fabregas as Tessa Tulfo
 Blakdyak as Banjo
 Gabby Eigenmann as Dicky
 Jeffrey Tam as Leo
 Mad Killah as Clayton
 Erwin Mendoza as Kirk
 Michelle Rufo as Egay
 Mai-Mai Montelibano as Barbara
 Charmaine Palermo as Mahal
 John Arceo as Rock
 Angela Zamora as Lara
 Niño Muhlach as Angie
 Sylvia Sanchez as Gigi
 Tess Dumpit as Mitos
 Mario Taguiwalo as Tiyo Lino
 Noel Trinidad as Chua
 Josie Galvez as Rock's Mother
 Madeleine Gallaga as Orson's Grandma
 Jomari Uy as Nestor
 Aiza Marquez as Dodge's Sister
 Boy Salvador as Berting
 Amy Robles as Tinto's Mother
 Michael Arguelles as Tinto's Brother
 Dianne Sandico as Girl in the Rain
 James Montelibano as Alice

Guest cast
 Alf Alacapa as Use Pardon in a Sentence
 Mel Kimura  as Social Welfare Woman
 Checcs Osmeña as Patring
 Marilu Santamaria as Miss Yazon
 Maricor Fortun as Aling Atang
 Nestor Yadao as General Nestor Torres
 Milton Dionzon as Tinok
 Jo Macasa as Lotus
 Erik Matti as Re-enactment Actor
 Teofe Alanano as Re-enactment Actor
 Boy Dolores as Re-enactment Actor
 Rustum Valero as Re-enactment Actor
 Gabriel Fernandez as Re-enactment Actor
 Gary Marzo as Re-enactment Actor
 Kale Abracia as Re-enactment Actor
 Mark Gil as Ralph Eigenmann
 Ian Veneracion as Father Tunggol
 Ramon Christopher as Botchok
 Michael de Mesa as Director
 Edu Manzano as Himself
 Manuel Benito as Manicurist
 Christopher Padilla as Security Guard

References

External links

1998 films
Filipino-language films
Philippine action films
Philippine gangster films
Neo Films films
Films directed by Peque Gallaga
Films directed by Lore Reyes